The 1896 Washington & Jefferson football team was an American football team that represented Washington & Jefferson College as an independent during the 1896 college football season.  Led by first-year head coach Clinton Woods, the team compiled a record of 8–0–1 and did not allow their opponents to score all season.

Schedule

Notes

References

Washington and Jefferson
Washington & Jefferson Presidents football seasons
College football undefeated seasons
Washington and Jefferson football